Nasiru Sulemana Gbadegbe is a Ghanaian lawyer and judge. He was a justice of the Supreme Court of Ghana between 2009 and 2020.

Early life and education
Gbadegbe hails from the Volta Region of Ghana. He was born on 8 December 1950. He obtained his bachelor of laws (LLB) degree in 1973 from the University of Ghana and subsequently received his qualifying Certificate in Law from the Ghana School of Law in 1975.

Career
Prior to Gbadegbe's appointment to the Supreme Court of Ghana in 2009, he had served on the Ghaanaian bench for twenty (20) years. He was appointed Justice of the High Court in 1989 and served in that capacity for a decade. In 1999, he was elevated to the Court of Appeal and he remained in that post until 2009 when he was appointed justice of the Supreme Court.

Appointment
Gbadegbe was nominated in 2009 by then president of Ghana, John Evans Atta Mills. He was vetted on Monday 12 October 2009 and approved unanimously by parliament on 30 October that same year. He was sworn into office by the then president on 2 November 2009.

Retirement
Gbadegbe retired in December 2020 from the Supreme Court after giving his valedictory judgement after thirty one years service in the judiciary.

See also
List of judges of the Supreme Court of Ghana
Supreme Court of Ghana

References

1950 births
Living people
Justices of the Supreme Court of Ghana
University of Ghana alumni